Ultimate Big Brother was the final series of the UK reality television programme Big Brother to air on Channel 4. The series was produced by Remarkable Pictures, a division of Endemol.

Ultimate Big Brother was an All Star edition of the Big Brother series - featuring memorable housemates from previous series of Big Brother, and Celebrity Big Brother. A 24-hour live streaming service was also available via the Big Brother website as a fee-based service. The series ended with Brian Dowling winning the title of the "Ultimate Housemate" and the words "Big Brother will get back to you".

Production
The series was first announced during the launch night of the eleventh series of Big Brother. The first trailer for Ultimate Big Brother was shown on 13 August 2010 during a live eviction episode of Big Brother. On the same day, Channel 4 released a promo image for the series on the Big Brother website. The promo featured 15 of the previous 186 Big Brother housemates and 68 Celebrity Big Brother housemates, along with the tag line "Who goes in? We decide".

Broadcasts

The Launch Night and first broadcast of Ultimate Big Brother was on 24 August 2010 as part of the Big Brother 11 final night show, presented by Davina McCall.

The main television coverage of Ultimate Big Brother was screened on Channel 4 using daily highlights programmes, narrated by Marcus Bentley. These episodes summarised the events of the previous day in the House. Although the schedule was erratic, in general the Monday to Thursday highlights episodes were shown at 10pm and aired for 70 minutes, whilst the weekend shows aired for 60 minutes at 9pm. The two-part, live eviction shows, hosted by Davina McCall, featured a highlights episode 9pm and a second show at 10:35pm in which the evicted housemate (or housemates) were interviewed. Eviction shows and highlights episodes were given a censored repeat the following morning on both Channel 4 and E4.

Alongside these highlights shows were spin-off programmes, Big Brother's Big Mouth and Big Brother's Little Brother, which comment on fandom, cultural reaction to the events within the House and include interviews with celebrities, former housemates and family and friends of housemates. Emma Willis and George Lamb presented Big Brother's Little Brother live on E4 at 6pm for 30 minutes Monday to Friday and on Channel 4 for an hour Sunday lunchtime. Big Brother's Big Mouth was fronted by McCall and aired on E4 for an hour after the main eviction programme.

Logo

The eye used for this series is the same used for Big Brother 2010.

The titles are almost identical to the Big Brother 2010 titles, except for small snippets of titles from previous series.

House
Since the third series in 2002, the programme was filmed at Elstree Studios in Borehamwood, Hertfordshire. The House for Ultimate Big Brother was the same House used for the eleventh series and was mainly glass walled with floral designs. The entrance had a heaven theme with a single staircase and the Diary Room underneath, to the right hand side. The Diary Room reflected the heaven theme with wings on the chair and a sky scene as the backdrop. A small task room was located off of the Diary Room. Upon entering the living room, there was one large red sofa. In contrast to the kitchen and bathroom's modern effect, the bedroom consisted of Salvador Dalí designs on the beds. 

The bedroom also contained a walk-in wardrobe. The store room for the house was located off of the kitchen. The garden had a carnival theme and included a carousel (for the smoking area) and a snug (called the nest). The garden also contained a mini pool/tub and outdoor showers. A large task room was located off of the garden and the garden toilet could be used to access a smaller task room. On the penultimate day of Big Brother 2010 it was revealed that a few changes had been made to the house prior to Ultimate Big Brother beginning; the glass walls of the shower were made frosted and the cameras were removed from the toilets in order to respect the privacy of the celebrity housemates.

The House included several features present from Big Brother 2010:

Bob Righter – a fortune teller machine used to predict the future,
Davina McCaw – a mechanical parrot in the living room used to recall previous conversations made by the housemates,
Tree of Temptation – a chest of drawers in the bathroom made from the Tree of Temptation present in 2010's celebrity series.

In celebration of the final series the House also included a secret bedsit, which had previously been used in Big Brother 2004. The Ultimate Big Brother bedsit housed Michelle Bass and Victor Ebuwa from Day 4 to Day 6. The bedsit had its own Diary Room (a copy of the Diary Room from Big Brother 5; albeit with the Diary Room chair similar to that from Big Brother 3) and was used to spy on and reward or punish the housemates. Michelle also inhabited the 2004 series' bedsit with Emma Greenwood and Victor was one of their prank victims.

Title sequence
The title sequence remained similar to the titles used during Big Brother 11, but also incorporated short fragments of each of the title sequences from the other ten regular series of Big Brother.

Format
The editing format used was similar to the previous regular series, as was the eviction format, except all housemates interviews were performed outside instead of in the studio and songs were played as they exited the house*, however the three finalists Brian, Nikki and Chantelle all left the house to a live orchestra. Songs played were:

Brian - "Never Forget" by Take That
Nikki - "Crazy" by Gnarls Barkley
Chantelle - "She's So Lovely" by Scouting for Girls
Victor - "Here Comes the Hotstepper" by Ini Kamoze
Nick - "Bad" by Michael Jackson
Preston -  "Boys Will Be Boys" by The Ordinary Boys
Ulrika - "My First Kiss" by 3OH!3 featuring Ke$ha
Vanessa - "Turn Around" by Phats & Small
Michelle - "Dynamite" by Taio Cruz
Nadia - "A Little Bit of Action" by Nadia Almada
Makosi - "Bootylicious" by Destiny's Child
John - "Rude Boy" by Rihanna
Note: Josie and Coolio did not leave via the eviction process.

Housemates
On Day 1, following the Big Brother 11 final, 11 former housemates entered the Ultimate Big Brother House. Josie Gibson, as the winner of Big Brother 11 returned to the house after being crowned a winner. She was then joined by 5 more housemates from regular civilian Big Brother series and 5 housemates from Celebrity Big Brother series. On Day 4, two new housemates (Michelle and Victor) entered the bedsit. They were both allowed full access to the House on Day 6. A third new housemate (Vanessa) entered the House on Day 11.

† Indicates that housemate died after filming had ended.

House guests

Throughout the series, ex-housemates from previous series of former Big Brother housemates and presenters entered the Ultimate Big Brother House as part of tasks or have been involved in the series for other reasons.

Summary

Nominations table

Notes
: As Josie walked during the nomination process, all nominations for her became invalid and any housemates who nominated her had to later choose a replacement nominee. John originally nominated Josie and Coolio for eviction, but post-Josie's exit replaced his nomination for Josie with Brian.
: As new housemates, Michelle and Victor were exempt from nominations. Whilst nominating, housemates had to endure various individual tasks from past series of Big Brother in "Nostalgic Nominations". This week there was a double eviction, meaning the three or more housemates with the most nominations faced eviction. Had this been a single eviction, only Makosi and Nick would have faced the public vote.
: During Day 13's nominations, housemates participated in  "Nominations Roulette" - with the wheel determining what how a housemate must deliver their nominations to Big Brother. As with the previous week, this week was a double eviction, meaning the three or more housemates with the most nominations faced eviction. Had this been a single eviction, the same housemates would still have faced the public vote. Even though she was a new housemate, Vanessa was permitted to nominate and could be nominated so that she did not have a free pass to the final.
: For the final two days, the public were voting for who they wanted to win rather than to evict.

Ratings
These viewing figures are taken from BARB and include Channel 4 +1 (except those marked with an asterisk*).

Final series commemorations

Additional programming
During the final week of Ultimate Big Brother, two special edition programs aired on Channel 4. The first of these was a Come Dine with Me special episode, called Come Dine with Me: Big Brother Winners, which aired on 6 September 2010. This episode featured Brian Dowling (Big Brother 2 winner), Nadia Almada (Big Brother 5 winner), Brian Belo (Big Brother 8 winner) and Sophie Reade (Big Brother 10 winner). Dowling came first in this competition, winning £1,000 for charity. The second of these special edition programmes was an 8 Out of 10 Cats special; 8 Out of 10 Cats: Big Brother Special, which aired on 9 September 2010. This episode featured Big Brother winners Brian Belo and Josie Gibson as panelists, ex-housemates John James Parton, Aisleyne Horgan-Wallace, Eugene Sully, Makosi Musambasi, Mario Marconi and Amanda and Sam Marchant as special guests and a voice-over from Big Brother narrator Marcus Bentley. Gibson's team beat Belo's with scores of 4 and 3 respectively. In addition to these programmes, Davina McCall was a guest on Alan Carr: Chatty Man on 5 September 2010 to discuss Ultimate Big Brother. The first series of Big Brother was also a major discussion topic on the one-off Channel 4 programme My Funniest Year: 2000, which featured Craig Phillips and Nick Bateman as guests and aired on 4 September 2010.

Two special, one-off programmes also aired on Channel 4 on the final night of Ultimate Big Brother on 10 September 2010. Dermot O'Leary, former Big Brother's Little Brother presenter, was joined by 11 former housemates (Craig Phillips, Narinder Kaur, Alex Sibley, Cameron Stout, Marco Sabba, Anthony Hutton, Pete Bennett, Brian Belo, Rex Newmark, Bea Hamill and Ben Duncan) in Big Brother: Dermot's Last Supper to discuss the most memorable moments from the last 11 regular Big Brother series. Following this, Davina McCall relived some of her most unforgettable moments from Big Brother history in front of an audience of fans and former housemates, including Celebrity Big Brother 4 contestant Pete Burns, in Davina's Big Send Off.

Jade Goody: Ultimate Housemate
During the first show of the Ultimate Big Brother final, a 10-minute documentary entitled Jade Goody: Ultimate Housemate was shown in memory of Big Brother contestant Jade Goody, who died in March 2009 from cervical cancer. Goody appeared in Big Brother 3, Celebrity Big Brother 5 and Big Brother Panto and in the second season of Bigg Boss, the Indian version of Big Brother.

DVD release
To commemorate the 11 regular Big Brother series, Channel 4 released Big Brother's Big DVD on 30 August 2010. The DVD contains three fan favourite episodes as voted for by viewers and Davina McCall; Emma and Michelle move into the bedsit in Big Brother 5, the electric shock task from Big Brother 9 and robots take over the House in Big Brother 11. The DVD also includes a rundown of the best bits of all 11 series of Big Brother from 2000 to 2010.

References

External links
 Official Website (same used for BB11)
 

2010 British television seasons
UK
Television shows shot at Elstree Film Studios